Reventón del Rio Mundo is a waterfall and source of the Mundo River in the Province of Albacete, Spain.

Geography of the Province of Albacete
Waterfalls of Spain
Landforms of Castilla–La Mancha